Atrophin-1 is a protein that in humans is encoded by the ATN1 gene. The encoded protein includes a serine repeat and a region of alternating acidic and basic amino acids, as well as the variable glutamine repeat. The function of Atrophin-1 has not yet been determined. There is evidence provided by studies of Atrophin-1 in animals to suggest it acts as a transcriptional co-repressor.   Atrophin-1 can be found in the nuclear and cytoplasmic compartments of neurons. It is expressed in nervous tissue.

Function 
The function of Atrophin-1 has not been defined yet. It is widely hypothesized that Atrophin-1 functions as a transcriptional co-repressor. A transcriptional co-repressor is a protein that indirectly suppresses the activity of specific genes by interacting with DNA-binding proteins.

Clinical significance 

The ATN1 gene has a segment of DNA called the CAG trinucleotide repeat. It is made up of cytosine, adenine, and guanine. The number of CAG repeats in the ATN1 gene in a healthy person will range from six to thirty-five repeats. CAG repeats that exceed thirty-five can cause a gain-of-function mutation in ATN1. Studies have supported the idea that mutated Atrophin-1 gathers in neurons and disrupts cell function. The sequence of the ATN1 gene contains a nuclear localizing signal (NLS) and a nuclear export signal (NES). It has been shown that a mutation of the NES in ATN1 can change where ATN1 localizes, and can cause aggregation to occur in the nucleus. This can lead to an increase in cellular toxicity.

Mutations in ATN1 are associated with a form of trinucleotide repeat disorder known as "dentatorubral-pallidoluysian atrophy" or "dentatorubropallidoluysian atrophy". Dentatorubral-pallidoluysian atrophy (DRPLA) is a rare neurodegenerative disorder characterized by cerebellar ataxia, myoclonic epilepsy, choreoathetosis, and dementia. The disorder is related to the expansion of a trinucleotide repeat within this gene.  In patients with DRPLA, truncated ATN1 has been observed forming intranuclear aggregates that cause cell death. The symptoms of this disorder can be credited to the significant reduction of brain and spinal tissue observed in those afflicted with DRPLA. There are both juvenile-onset and late adult-onset variants of DRPLA, which show differing degrees of severity of specific symptoms.

Interactions 

ATN1 has been shown to interact with:
 BAIAP2, 
 MAGI1,
 MAGI2, 
 RERE,  and
 WWP2.

References

Further reading

External links 
GeneReviews/NCBI/NIH/UW entry on DRPLA
 
 

Transcription coregulators